The Puerto Rico Natural Resources Ranger Corps is the law enforcement conservation officers for the Commonwealth of Puerto Rico. Its primary mission is to protect endemic plants and animals of Puerto Rico, prevent the introduction of invasive animals and plants and prosecute any person who violates environmental laws.

Its headquarters are located at State Road PR-8838, Km. 6.3, El Cinco neighborhood, in San Juan.

History
Guards Corps was created on June 29, 1977 by Act No.1 SE. The Corps or Rangers are responsible for ensuring the protection of natural resources, monitoring the observance of the laws and regulations that protect the environment, and preventing pollution of the environment. The Corps also serves as the police in all areas under the jurisdiction of the Department of Environment and Natural Resources.  

Since 2004 the agency has had 310 rangers and has been unable to train new members due to lack of funds. The rangers of the agency are represented by the Servidores Públicos Unidos de Puerto Rico (United Public Servants of Puerto Rico). Since 2020 the union has requested raises in the salaries of its members. In 2021 the union condemned the inhumane working conditions for workers stationed on Isla de Mona.

References

Department of Natural and Environmental Resources of Puerto Rico
Government agencies established in 1979
Specialist law enforcement agencies of Puerto Rico